is a Japanese figure skater. He is the 2022–23 Grand Prix Final silver medalist, a two-time silver medalist on the Grand Prix circuit (2022 Grand Prix de France, 2022 NHK Trophy), and the 2023 World University Games champion.

Earlier in his career, he was the 2016 Youth Olympic champion, the 2015 World Junior bronze medalist, a two-time Junior Grand Prix Final medalist (silver in 2014, bronze in 2015), and the 2015–16 Japan junior national champion.

Career
Yamamoto started skating when he was five. He is a 3-time Japanese national novice medalist. He was invited to skate in the gala at the 2013 World Team Trophy as the Japanese national novice champion in the same season.

2013–14 season
Yamamoto debuted on the ISU Junior Grand Prix series in 2013–14 season, placing 11th in Riga, Latvia, his sole assignment. At the Japan Championships, he was 5th in the junior competition and 14th at the senior event.

2014–15 season

During the 2014–15 JGP series, Yamamoto won silver medals in Courchevel, France and Tallinn, Estonia, which qualified him to the 2014–15 JGP Final in Barcelona, Spain. Ranked first in the short program and third in the free skate, he finished second overall, behind Shoma Uno and ahead of Alexander Petrov. Nationally, he was the junior silver medalist, behind Shoma Uno, and finished 6th at the senior event. At the 2015 World Junior Championships, Yamamoto placed 7th in the short program and 3rd in the free skate to win the bronze medal in his first appearance at that competition.

2015–16 season
Competing in the 2015–16 ISU Junior Grand Prix, Yamamoto won the bronze medal in Colorado Springs, Colorado and gold in Toruń, Poland. These results qualified him for the 2015–16 JGP Final, where he was awarded the bronze medal. He won his first junior national title at the 2015 Japanese Junior Championships.

In February 2016, Yamamoto won the gold medal in the men's singles discipline at the Winter Youth Olympics ahead of Latvia's Deniss Vasiljevs and Russia's Dmitri Aliev. He fractured his right ankle in practice on March 12, causing him to withdraw from the 2016 World Junior Championships in Debrecen.

2017–18 season
After missing the entirety of the 2016–2017 season, Yamamoto returned to competition domestically at the 2017–18 Japan Championships, placing ninth.  Venturing out internationally, he placed fifth at the Coupe du Printemps.

2018–19 season
Debuting on the Challenger series, Yamamoto won gold at the 2018 CS Asian Open.  He fared less well at his second Challenger, placing ninth at the 2018 CS Finlandia Trophy.  Making his Grand Prix debut, Yamamoto was sixth at Japan's 2018 NHK Trophy.  Ninth at the Japan Championships, he finished the season with a gold medal at the Challenge Cup.

2019–20 season
Again beginning the season with two Challenger assignments, Yamamoto won the silver medal at the 2019 CS U.S. Classic after placing third in the short program and second in the free skate. the season at the 2019 CS Finlandia Trophy, and led the field after the short program, in which he set a new personal best and landed two quad jumps.  He fell four times in the free skate, placing sixth in the segment, but narrowly took the silver medal overall.

2020–21 season
Yamamoto won the gold medal at the domestic Western Sectionals championship, qualifying for a berth to the national championships. Assigned to the 2020 NHK Trophy, he placed eighth.  He was ninth at the 2020–21 Japan Championships.

2021–22 season
Yamamoto debuted on the Grand Prix at the 2021 Skate Canada International, finishing in seventh. He was seventh as well at the 2021 NHK Trophy, and said afterwards he felt he was "able to grow a little bit since Skate Canada." Yamamoto finished the fall season with a gold medal at the 2021 CS Warsaw Cup.

At the 2021–22 Japan Championships, Yamamoto finished in eight place. He went on to win the bronze medal at the International Challenge Cup.

2022–23 season
Beginning the season on the Grand Prix, Yamamoto won the short program at the 2022 Grand Prix de France. He was overtaken in the free skate by Frenchman Adam Siao Him Fa, but still scored a new personal best in that segment and won the silver medal, his first Grand Prix podium placement. Yamamoto reflected on his past struggles with injury, saying that it made the moment "special for me, and I know I couldn't have achieved it myself. I have had all the support from my team as well as support from the fans." At his second event, the 2022 NHK Trophy on home ice in Sapporo, Yamamoto again finished first in the short program with a new personal best score of 96.49, ahead of reigning World champion Shoma Uno. He was again overtaken in the free skate, this time by Uno, but won his second silver medal and qualified to the Grand Prix Final for the first time. He said that he was pleased at the prospect of competing together with Uno at the Final.

At the Final in Turin, Yamamoto finished second in the short program behind Uno. He assessed that his quad Salchow was "not perfect, but I am happy I was able to skate without any mistakes and going into the free skating, it will be a confidence boost." The segment also saw several other skaters, such as widely-favoured American Ilia Malinin, underperform. In the free skate, Yamamoto set a new personal best (on his way to a personal best total score as well), finishing third in the segment behind Uno and Malinin, but remaining second overall. Winning the silver medal, he said he was pleased to have delivered a satisfactory free skate for the first time in the season and to have achieved his goal of making the podium.

Yamamoto finished third in the short program at the 2022–23 Japan Championships, but a seventh-place free skate dropped him to fifth overall. Despite this, due to the Japan Skating Federation's selection criteria incorporating international results, he was selected as Japan's third man for the 2023 World Championships, which occasioned some controversy due to national silver medalist Koshiro Shimada being passed over.

Named to the Japanese team for the 2023 Winter World University Games in Lake Placid, Yamamoto won the gold medal, finishing more than thirty points ahead of silver medalist Tatsuya Tsuboi. He then won the silver medal at the International Challenge Cup at the end of February.

Programs

Competitive highlights

GP: Grand Prix; CS: Challenger Series; JGP: Junior Grand Prix

2016–17 season to present

Earlier career

Detailed results
Small medals for short program and free skating awarded only at ISU Championships. ISU Personal bests highlighted in bold.

Senior level

Junior level

References

External links 

 

 

2000 births
Japanese male single skaters
Living people
People from Kishiwada, Osaka
Figure skaters at the 2016 Winter Youth Olympics
Youth Olympic gold medalists for Japan
World Junior Figure Skating Championships medalists
Competitors at the 2023 Winter World University Games
Medalists at the 2023 Winter World University Games
21st-century Japanese people
Universiade medalists in figure skating
Universiade gold medalists for Japan